Eretmocera syleuta is a moth of the family Scythrididae. It was described by Edward Meyrick in 1926. It is found in South Africa (Western Cape).

References

Endemic moths of South Africa
syleuta
Moths described in 1926